"In Jesus Name (God Of Possible)" is a song by American contemporary Christian music singer Katy Nichole, released on January 26, 2022, as the lead single from her debut extended play, Katy Nichole (2022). Nichole co-wrote the song with Ethan Hulse, Jeff Pardo and David Spencer.

"In Jesus Name (God Of Possible)" peaked at number one on both the US Hot Christian Songs chart and on the Bubbling Under Hot 100 chart. The song was ranked by Billboard as the biggest Christian song in 2022. It was nominated for the GMA Dove Award for Pop/Contemporary Recorded Song of the Year at the 2022 GMA Dove Awards.

Background
In January 2022, Katy Nichole announced that she was signed with Centricity Music, and released "In Jesus Name (God of Possible)" as her debut single, indicating that her debut studio album was in the works. A snippet of the song's chorus sung by Nichole had been released on TikTok prior to the single's release, garnering over 80 million streams.

Writing and development
Nichole shared the story behind the song, saying: 

Nichole further shared that her record label noticed the traction that the song was getting and suggested to her that she write "a song that was a prayer in Jesus' name."

Composition

Reception

Critical response
Reviewing for 365 Days Of Inspiring Media, Jonathan Andre gave a positive opinion of the song, saying: "It's a song that embodies hope and encouragement, but also is a reminder to keep singing and to keep asking the bold questions, even if healing doesn't come." Jacob Airey of StudioJake Media wrote a positive review of the song, saying: "The song is a heartwarming and encouraging song. It is a prayerful set of lyrics that remind the listener that someone is always praying for them. I like how she focuses in on the power of Christ and how He loves us as our Savior. Nichole brings a lot of exhortation to you and while the song is simplistic, you will feel encouraged." Briauna Prieto of Peer Magazine wrote a positive review of the song, saying: ""In Jesus' Name (God of Possible)" by Katy Nichole reminds us that strength and endurance only come from the power of Jesus—power that is always ours! Although this song is slow, easy to follow and simple to learn, it contains a huge message, and could serve as a reminder to pray for others."

Accolades

Commercial performance
"In Jesus Name (God of Possible)" debuted at number four on the Christian Digital Song Sales chart dated February 5, 2022. The following week, the song debuted at number 30 on the US Hot Christian Songs chart dated February 12, 2022, concurrently peaking at number 26 on the Christian Airplay chart, and number one on the Christian Digital Song Sales chart. The song was a breakthrough hit, as it registered in the top ten sector of the Hot Christian Songs chart dated March 12, 2022, at number three. It went on to reach number one on the Hot Christian Songs chart dated March 26, 2022, on the back of significant gains in radio airplay and downloads. The song also concurrently debuted at number 18 on Bubbling Under Hot 100 chart. The song went on to reach number one on the Bubbling Under Hot 100 chart, as well as the Christian Airplay chart dated April 30, 2022.

Music videos
On March 5, 2022, Katy Nichole released the official music video for "In Jesus Name (God of Possible)" on YouTube. The music video was directed by Nathan Schneider and produced by Joshua Wurzelbacher and Alicia St. Gelais.

On March 10, 2022, Essential Worship released an acoustic performance video of "In Jesus Name (God Of Possible)" by Katy Nichole via YouTube. On March 24, 2022, Katy Nichole released the official lyric video for the piano version of the song through YouTube. On May 27, 2022, Katy Nichole released the official audio video for the live version of "In Jesus Name (God of Possible)" with North Point Worship on YouTube.

Track listing

Personnel
Adapted from AllMusic.
 Jacob Arnold – drums
 Chris Bevins – editing assistant
 Mike Cervantes – mastering
 Court Clement – guitar
 Nickie Conley – background vocals
 Jason Eskridge – background vocals
 John Mays – A&R
 Wil Merrell – background vocals
 Sean Moffitt – mixing
 Katy Nichole – background vocals, primary artist, vocals
 Jeff Pardo – background vocals, keyboards, piano, producer, programming, synthesizer bass
 Kiley Phillips – background vocals

Charts

Weekly charts

Year-end charts

Release history

References

External links
 

2022 singles
2022 songs
Katy Nichole songs
Songs written by Katy Nichole
Songs written by Ethan Hulse
Songs written by Jeff Pardo